The South West Football League is an Australian rules football league based in the south-west of Western Australia. The league is affiliated to the West Australian Country Football League.

History
The idea of creating a larger league was discussed early in 1951. The idea that three clubs from the Collie Football Association and the three clubs from the Bunbury Football association would invigorate public interest in the South West region on the state. Talks continued into 1952 and it was finally agreed to trial a competition with all the two associations clubs for a two-year period. The associations administrations would remain separate. Sensing opportunity, Donnybrook left their local competition to become the seventh club.

In 1953 the Bunbury-Collie League was founded with seven teams. South Bunbury, Bunbury Railways, Bunbury Pastimes, Mines Rovers, Collie Railways, Centrals and Donnybrook. The public response was evident, interest was up, attendances to games were up and the general standard of play improved greatly.

The trial was deemed so successful that it kicked off a series of consolidations of smaller leagues within the state of Western Australia.

1954 Eastern and Western Districts Busselton commenced from Busselton FA.
1955 Eastern and Western Districts Busselton amalgamated to become Busselton
1956 Harvey Brunswick admitted, Bunbury Pastimes becomes Carey Park
1957, the league changed names to the South West National Football League.
1959 Boyanup-Capel-Dardanup joins
1961 Collie Railways and centrals amalgamate to become Collie
1966 Augusta-Margaret River joins
1990 Harvey Brunswick become Harvey Brunswick Leschenault
1991 the name changed again, to the current South West Football League
2000 Boyanup-Capel-Dardanup relocates to Eaton and changes name to Eaton Boomers.
2001 Collie and Mines Rovers amalgamated to become Collie Eagles
2009 Harvey Bulls commence, transferred from Peel Football League.
2022 Dunsborough Sharks women's, colts and reserves team commence playing

Expansion
In 1993 a proposed submission from the new Harvey Football Club was rejected because the SWFL believed10 teams was a sufficient number. Harvey then put in a successful submission into the Peel Football League where they played their first season in 1994.

The start of the 2009 season saw the introduction of the Harvey Bulls, who made the move over from the expanding Peel Football League. This was different from their bid in 1993, as they had nowhere else to go. The SWFL were also looking for a tenth team (after the merger of Collie and Mines) to get rid of the dreaded bye and extended season. Harvey left the PFL because of the rumour of Perth teams entering the PFL for 2009 so therefore increasing travel commitments. This idea fell through but Harvey still joined the SWFL after an 8–1 vote by the SWFL clubs, with HBL the only club opposing the idea.

During January 2021, the Dunsborough Sharks, who field juniors teams in the South West put in an application to field a colts side ahead of the 2021 season. This was rejected. Post the 2021 season the Dunsborough Sharks put in an application for a Reserves, Colts and Women's team for the 2022 season. These applications were accepted with a 7–3 vote, allowing the Sharks to field a league team for the 2023 season.

Clubs

Current clubs

Previous

Premierships

League

Grand Finals 2009-21

Notable players
Syd Jackson
Adam Hunter
Phil Matson
Leon Baker
Michael Warren
David Hollins
Phil Kelly
Michael Christian
Ben Stratton
Peter Miller
Lewis Jetta
Neville Jetta
Kyle Reimers
Anthony Morabito
Paul Barnard
Aaron Black
Kristin Thornton
Connor Blakely
Troy Ugle

References

Further reading 
 A Way of Life - The Story of country football in Western Australia - Alan East
 WA footy forum 

 
Australian rules football competitions in Western Australia
1957 establishments in Australia